The Trade Union and Labour Party Liaison Organisation (TULO) is a labour organisation in the United Kingdom that was set up in 1994 by a motion to the Labour Party's Annual Conference. It had several forerunning organisations that coordinated trade union support for the Labour Party at election times such as Trade Unions for a Labour Victory and Trade Unionists For Labour. TULO is different in that, as a more formal organisation, it serves the dual purposes of not only coordinating trade union support for the Labour Party at elections, but also of acting as the channel of communication between the Party Leadership and its affiliated trade unions.

Since 2002 TULO has taken a more visible role within the Labour Party, speaking up for pro-union policies. This work lead to the Warwick One Agreement (2004), which formed part of Labour's 2005 manifesto, and the Warwick Two Agreement (2008). It also led the campaigns to secure rights for Agency Workers (2007), increase statutory redundancy pay (2009), and to win compensation for sufferers of pleural plaques, a form of asbestosis (2010).

Since 2010 it has rebranded its campaigning activities as UnionsTogether, and has led the way on large-scale union digital campaigning. Key campaigns have included advocating improved pensions rights for older female workers, exposing coalition attacks on working rights, the NHS Condition Critical Campaign, and the Jobs & Fair Pay campaign. It has placed a particular emphasis on exposing UKIP policies to cut workers rights such as maternity, paternity, and sick pay.

TULO has been especially active on the issue of party funding, where it has sought to protect the engagement of trade unions in politics and to defend the role of the trade unions inside the Labour Party against the Conservative Party.

National TULO Committee
There are 13 trade unions currently affiliated to the Labour Party at national level. On affiliation to the Labour Party every union automatically becomes a member of the National Trade Union and Labour Party Liaison Organisation and its General Secretary is entitled to sit on the National TULO Committee if he or she is an individual member of the Labour Party. The Committee is jointly chaired by a member from the union side, currently Mick Whelan, and the Labour Party Leader, Keir Starmer.

Between 2002 and 2016 the TULO National Officer was Byron Taylor, a former trade union officer and Labour leader on Basildon Council. Since 2016 the National Officer has been Helen Pearce, the former Head of Campaigns and Communications.

The National Trade Union Labour Party Liaison Organisation Committee comprises:
 General Secretaries of all Labour's affiliated unions
 Leader of the Labour Party
 Deputy Leader of the Labour Party
 General Secretary of the Party
 Deputy General Secretary of the Party
 Nominee from the trade union group of MPs

See also 
Trade unions in the United Kingdom
List of trade unions in the United Kingdom
Labour Research Department
Affiliated trade union
Trades Unions Congress
Trade Union Group of Labour MPs
Labour Party (UK) affiliated trade union

External links 
 

Labour Party (UK)
Labour Party (UK) trade unions
1994 establishments in the United Kingdom
Organizations established in 1994